The Orange Route is a holiday route, that runs from Amsterdam in the Netherlands through North and Central Germany and returns to Amsterdam. It is 2,400 kilometres long and crosses the Netherlands and nine of German federated states. The Orange Route runs through towns and regions that linked the House of Orange-Nassau for centuries.

States 
The Orange Route runs from the Netherlands initially through the states of North Rhine-Westphalia, Rhineland-Palatinate and Hesse, first in a southerly, then in a northeasterly direction in order to head for Lower Saxony, Saxony-Anhalt, Brandenburg and Berlin. From there it heads northwest through Mecklenburg-Vorpommern and then turns westwards through Schleswig-Holstein, Bremen and Lower Saxony once again along the North Sea Coast near Amsterdam.

Landscapes
The holiday route crosses a great variety of different landscape types: the North Sea coast and the plains of the Netherlands, the Lower and Middle Rhine Valley, the green, sometimes rugged, sometimes gently Central Uplands, the Havelland, the Mecklenburg Lake District and finally the broad North German Plain. In detail, the regions are, starting from Amsterdam:

 North Sea region
 North Brabant
 Betuwe
 Lower Rhine
 Siegerland
 Middle Rhine
 Lahn
 Rheinhessen
 Westerwald
 Taunus
 Lahn-Dill region
 Waldeck Upland
 Weser Uplands
 Harz Mountains
 Elbe valley
 Havelland
 Mecklenburg Lake District
 Baltic Sea region
 Elbe water meadows
 Lower Weser
 North German Plain
 Veluwe
 Friesland
 West Friesland
 IJsselmeer

Sights 
Picturesque towns, castles, palaces and gardens may be found everywhere along this holiday road. Here are some of the places and sights that were linked to the House of Orange-Nassau:

 Amsterdam – Prinsenhof, today the Hotel The Grand
 The Hague (Den Haag) - Residence of Binnenhof
 Delft – St. Agatha's Abbey (Sint Agathakloster)
 Dordrecht – Berckepoort housing complex
 Breda – Breda Castle and the "Prince chapel" at the Onze-Lieve-Vrouwe Church
 Buren (Gelderland) – St. Lambertus' Church
 Apeldoorn – Summer residence of Paleis Het Loo
 Moers – Moers Castle
 Freudenberg – old town / former Nassau border fortifications
 Nassau – Nassau Castle
 Diez – Ladies' residence of Oranienstein with the Nassau-Orange Museum
 Dillenburg – Wilhelmsturm on the Schlossberg, birthplace of William I, Prince of Orange
 Siegen – Siegerland Museum in the Oberen Schloss with the Orange Forum
 Bad Arolsen – Arolsen Castle
 Bad Pyrmont – Summer residence of Schloss Pyrmont with its museum
 Wernigerode – Castle and museum of Wernigerode
 Stolberg (Harz) – Stolberg Castle
 Dessau – Mosigkau Castle
 Oranienbaum – castle and orangery
 Wörlitz – Landscape garden of Wörlitzer Anlagen and castle
 Potsdam – Dutch Quarter, Dutch Mill
 Oranienburg – Oranienburg Palace and orangery
 Schwerin – Residence castle of Schwerin and Ludwigslust Castle
 Hitzacker – Prince Claus memorial busts
 Lingen – old town
 Nordhorn – Frenswegen Abbey
 Kamp-Lintfort – Kamp Abbey
 Leeuwarden – Princessehof Palace and Prinsentuin Gardens

References

External links
Orange Route with detailed location descriptions 

German tourist routes
Roads in Berlin
Roads in Brandenburg
Roads in Bremen
Roads in Hesse
Roads in Mecklenburg-Vorpommern
Roads in Lower Saxony
Roads in North Rhine-Westphalia
Roads in Rhineland-Palatinate
Roads in Saxony-Anhalt
Roads in Schleswig-Holstein
Rhineland